Sundown towns, also known as sunset towns, gray towns, or sundowner towns, are all-white municipalities or neighborhoods in the United States that practice a form of racial segregation by excluding non-whites via some combination of discriminatory local laws, intimidation or violence. The term came from signs posted that "colored people" had to leave town by sundown.

Entire sundown counties and sundown suburbs were also created by the same process. The practice was not restricted to the southern states, with New Jersey and other northern states being described as equally inhospitable to black travelers until at least the early 1960s. Current practices in a number of present-day towns, in the view of some commentators, perpetuate a modified version of the sundown town.

Discriminatory policies and actions distinguish sundown towns from towns that have no black residents for demographic reasons. Historically, towns have been confirmed as sundown towns by newspaper articles, county histories, and Works Progress Administration files, corroborated by tax or U.S. census records showing an absence of black people or sharp drop in the black population between two censuses.

History
The earliest legal restrictions on the nighttime activities and movements of African Americans and other ethnic minorities date back to the colonial era. The general court and legislative assembly of New Hampshire passed "An Act To Prevent Disorders In The Night" in 1714: 

Notices emphasizing and re-affirming the curfew were published in The New Hampshire Gazette in 1764 and 1771.

Following the end of the Reconstruction era, thousands of towns and counties across the United States became sundown localities, as part of the imposition of Jim Crow laws and other segregationist practices. In most cases, the exclusion was official town policy or was promulgated by the community's real estate agents via exclusionary covenants governing who could buy or rent property. In others, the policy was enforced through intimidation. This intimidation could occur in a number of ways, including harassment by law enforcement officers. Though widely believed to be a thing of the past—racially restrictive covenants were struck down by the Supreme Court in its 1948 Shelley v. Kraemer decision—many hundreds of towns continue to effectively exclude black people and other minorities in the twenty-first century.

In 1844, Oregon, which had banned slavery, banned African Americans from the territory altogether. Those who failed to leave could expect to receive lashings under a law known as the "Peter Burnett Lash Law", named for Provisional Supreme Judge Peter Burnett. No persons were ever lashed under the law; it was quickly amended to replace lashing with forced labor, and eventually repealed the following year after a change in the makeup of the legislature. However, additional laws aimed at African Americans entering Oregon were ratified in 1849 and 1857, the last of which was not repealed until 1926. This law in Oregon was the foreshadowing of future laws restricting where minorities could live, not only in Oregon but other jurisdictions.

Outside Oregon, other places looked to laws and legislation to restrict black people from residing within cities, towns, and states. In 1853, all blacks were banned from entering the state of Indiana. Those who were caught in the state and unable to pay the fine were punished by being re-enslaved and sold at auction. Similar bans on all black migration were passed in Michigan, Ohio, and Iowa.

New laws were enacted in the 20th century. One example is Louisville, Kentucky, whose mayor proposed a law in 1911 that would restrict black people from owning property in certain parts of the city. This city ordinance reached public attention when it was challenged in the U.S. Supreme Court case Buchanan v. Warley in 1917. Ultimately, the court decided that the laws passed in Louisville were unconstitutional, thus setting the legal precedent that similar laws could not exist or be passed in the future. This one legal victory did not stop towns from developing into sundown towns. City planners and real estate companies used their power and authority to ensure that white communities remained white, and black communities remained black. These were private individuals making decisions to personally benefit themselves, their companies' profits, or their cities' alleged safety, so their methods in creating sundown towns were often ignored by the courts. In addition to unfair housing rules, citizens turned to violence and harassment in making sure black people would not remain in their cities after sundown. Whites in the North felt that their way of life was threatened by the increased minority populations moving into their neighborhoods and racial tensions started to build. This often boiled over into violence, sometimes extreme, such as the 1943 Detroit race riot.

Since the civil rights movement of the 1950s and 1960s, and especially since the Fair Housing Act of 1968's prohibition of racial discrimination in the sale, rental, and financing of housing, the number of sundown towns has decreased. However, as sociologist James W. Loewen writes in his book, Sundown Towns: A Hidden Dimension of American Racism (2005), it is impossible to precisely count the number of sundown towns at any given time, because most towns have not kept records of the ordinances or signs that marked the town's sundown status. He further notes that hundreds of cities across America have been sundown towns at some point in their history.

Additionally, Loewen writes that sundown status meant more than just that African Americans were unable to live in these towns. Any black people who entered or were found in sundown towns after sunset were subject to harassment, threats, and violence, including lynching.

The Supreme Court case Brown v. Board of Education ruled segregation of schools unconstitutional in 1954. Loewen argues that the case caused some municipalities in the South to become sundown towns: Missouri, Tennessee, and Kentucky saw drastic drops in African-American populations living in those states following the decision.

Function

Ethnic exclusions
African Americans were not the only minority group not allowed to live in white towns. One example, according to Loewen, is that in 1870, Chinese people made up one-third of Idaho's population. Following a wave of violence and an 1886 anti-Chinese convention in Boise, almost none remained by 1910.

The towns of Minden, Nevada, and Gardnerville, Nevada, had an ordinance from 1917 to 1974 that required Native Americans to leave the towns by 6:30 p.m. each day. A whistle, later a siren, was sounded at 6 p.m. daily alerting Native Americans to leave by sundown. In 2021, the state of Nevada passed a law prohibiting the appropriation of Native American imagery by the mascots of schools, and the sounding of sirens that were once associated with Sundown ordinances. Despite this law, Minden has continued to play its siren, claiming it as being a nightly tribute to first responders.

In Nevada, the ban was expanded to include Japanese Americans.

Two examples of the numerous road signs documented during the first half of the 20th century include:
 In Colorado: "No Mexicans After Night".
 In Connecticut: "Whites Only Within City Limits After Dark".

In Maria Marulanda's 2011 article in the Fordham Law Review titled "Preemption, Patchwork Immigration Laws, and the Potential for Brown Sundown Towns", Marulanda outlines the possibility for non-blacks to be excluded from towns in the United States. Marulanda argued that immigration laws and ordinances in certain municipalities could create similar situations to those experienced by African Americans in sundown towns. Hispanic Americans are likely to suffer, despite the purported target being undocumented immigrants, in these cases of racial exclusion.

From 1851 to at least 1876, Antioch, California, had a sundown ordinance that barred Chinese residents from being out in public after dark. In 1876, white residents drove the Chinese out of town and then burned down the Chinatown section of the city.

Chinese Americans were also excluded from most of San Francisco, leading to the establishment of Chinatown.

Travel guides

Described by former NAACP President Julian Bond as "one of the survival tools of segregated life", The Negro Motorist Green Book (at times titled The Negro Traveler's Green Book or The Negro Motorist Green-Book, and commonly referred to simply as the "Green Book") was an annual segregation-era guidebook for African American motorists, published by New York travel agent and former Hackensack, New Jersey, letter carrier Victor H. Green. It was published in the United States from 1936 to 1966, during the Jim Crow era, when discrimination against non-whites was widespread.

Road trips for African Americans were fraught with inconveniences and dangers because of racial segregation, racial profiling by police, the phenomenon of travelers just "disappearing", and the existence of numerous sundown towns. According to author Kate Kelly, "there were at least 10,000 'sundown towns' in the United States as late as the 1960s; in a 'sundown town' nonwhites had to leave the city limits by dusk, or they could be picked up by the police or worse. These towns were not limited to the South—they ranged from Levittown, N.Y., to Glendale, Calif., and included the majority of municipalities in Illinois." The Green Book also advised drivers to wear, or have ready, a chauffeur's cap and, if stopped, relate that "they were delivering a car for a white person."

On June 7, 2017, the NAACP issued a warning to prospective African American travelers to Missouri. This is the first NAACP warning ever covering an entire state. The NAACP conference president suggested that, if prospective African American travelers must go to Missouri, they travel with bail money in hand.

Sundown suburbs 

Many suburban areas in the United States were incorporated following the establishment of Jim Crow laws. The majority of suburbs were made up of all white residents from the time they were first created. Harassment and inducements contributed to keep African Americans out of new suburban areas. Schooling also played a large role in keeping the suburbs white. The suburbs often did not provide schools for black people, causing black families to send their children to school in large municipalities such as Atlanta, Georgia.

In the 21st century
In 2019, sociologist Heather O'Connell wrote that sundown towns are "(primarily) a thing of the past", but writer Morgan Jerkins disagreed, saying: "Sundown towns have never gone away." Historian James W. Loewen notes persisting effects of sundown towns' violently enforced segregation even after they may have been integrated to a small degree, a phenomenon he calls "second-generation sundown towns."

For example, Ferguson, Missouri, was never a sundown city, but its black population dwindled to only 15 while the total population grew to over 22,000 by 1960 and the black population in nearby areas grew substantially. In 2018, four out of six Ferguson city councilors were black, and the police department was much more diverse. A consent decree had prohibited racial profiling.  The terms of the consent decree prohibited activities that would categorize Ferguson as a second-generation sundown city. As of 2020, the consent decree has only been partially implemented, leaving Ferguson's status as a second-generation sundown city unclear.

In response to an increase in violent crime, Chicago enacted a 6:00 pm curfew for youths in May 2022 at Millennium Park. The American Civil Liberties Union of Illinois said the curfew would result in "unnecessary stops and arrests" of young black people, and Chicago Alderman Roderick Sawyer said the curfew was "discriminatory" and would make black children feel "they don’t belong in certain parts" of Chicago.

Sundown towns in popular culture 

 Gentleman's Agreement (1947), is known as "the only feature film [of its era] to treat sundown towns seriously." However, it dealt with a town that excluded Jewish people rather than black people. According to James W. Loewen, "The anti-Nazi ideology opened more sundown suburbs to Jews than to African Americans... Gentleman's Agreement, Elia Kazan's 1948 Academy Award-winning movie [exposed] Darien, Connecticut, as an anti-Jewish sundown town."
 The Fugitive Kind (1959), a film directed by Sidney Lumet and starring Marlon Brando and Anna Magnani, mentions sundown towns. A Southern sheriff tells Brando's character about a sign in the small town that reads, "Nigger, don't let the sun go down on you in this county." The same sign is shown in Tennessee Williams's play Orpheus Descending, upon which the film is based.
 In her memoir I Know Why the Caged Bird Sings (1969), poet Maya Angelou describes Mississippi as inhospitable to African Americans after dark: "Don't let the sun set on you here nigger, Mississippi."
 Oprah Winfrey visited Forsyth County, Georgia, on a 1987 episode of her television show. At the beginning of the 20th century, the county was known for its expulsion of African Americans.
 Trouble Behind (1991), a documentary by Robby Henson, examines the history and legacy of racism in Corbin, Kentucky, a small railroad community noteworthy both as the home of Colonel Sanders' Kentucky Fried Chicken and for "its race riots of 1919, during which over two hundred blacks were loaded onto boxcars and shipped out of town." The film aired at the 1991 Sundance Film Festival and was nominated for the Grand Jury Prize.
 No Niggers, No Jews, No Dogs (2000), a play by John Henry Redwood.
 Banished: How Whites Drove Blacks Out of Town in America (2006), a documentary by Marco Williams which was inspired by Elliot Jaspin's book Buried in the Bitter Waters: The Hidden History of Racial Cleansing in America (2007).
 Sundown Town (2011), a play by Kevin D. Cohea.
 The Injustice Files: Sundown Towns (February 24, 2014), an Investigation Discovery documentary by filmmaker Keith Beauchamp, executive produced by Al Roker.
 The 2016 video game Mafia III released a downloadable content story pack titled Faster, Baby, which sees African American protagonist Lincoln Clay assist a black rights activist group in taking down a sheriff enforcing a sundown policy in a small Louisiana parish.
 Green Book (2018), the Academy Award winner for Best Picture, is a comedy drama about a tour of the Deep South in the 1960s by African American classical and jazz pianist Don Shirley (Mahershala Ali), who is arrested in a Southern town for being out after sundown.
 2018 documentary Man on Fire about the 2014 self-immolation of anti-racist social justice pastor Charles Moore in Grand Saline, Texas, who was native to the town.
 Lovecraft Country (2020) (TV series based on the 2016 book written by Matt Ruff). Atticus Freeman joins up with his friend Letitia and his Uncle George to embark on a road trip across 1950s Jim Crow America in search of his missing father. In the first episode of the first season, the trio is pulled over by a police officer who informs them they are in a "sundown county" and then threatens to lynch them unless they can leave the county before sundown. Uncle George also wrote and published his own version of the Negro Motorist Green Book.
 American rapper Vince Staples raps about the subject in the song "Sundown Town" on his self titled album.

See also
 Sundown towns in the United States, a partial list of historical sundown towns in the United States
 List of expulsions of African Americans, including some towns that became sundown towns after they expelled their black populations
 Black Codes (United States)
 Racial covenants
 Racial segregation in the United States
 Racism against African Americans
 Racism in the United States
 Redlining
 Perth Prohibited Area, the Australian equivalent

References

Further reading
 
 
 
 
 
 
 
 
 
  Article on Vidor, Texas' long time reputation as a sundown town.

External links

 
 
 
 

 
African-American history of Oregon
American phraseology
History of African-American civil rights
History of racial segregation in the United States
History of racism in the United States
Racially motivated violence against African Americans
Types of towns
White supremacy in the United States